Parakh is a Bollywood social film. It was released in 1944. Directed by Sohrab Modi, it starred Mehtab, Yakub, Eruch Tarapore, Latika and Balwant Singh. The music was composed by Khursheed Anwar and Saraswati Devi.

References

External links
 

1944 films
1940s Hindi-language films
Films directed by Sohrab Modi
Films scored by Khurshid Anwar
Indian black-and-white films